Syeda Shehla Raza Zaidi (born 15 May 1964 in Karachi, Pakistan) is a Pakistan People's Party politician in the Sindh province of Pakistan. In 2008, she was unanimously elected deputy speaker in the Thirteenth Assembly of the Sindh Assembly, and re-elected in 2013 for that position in the Fourteenth Assembly.

Early education
Raza completed her undergraduate and graduate education at the University of Karachi, receiving her Master's degree in Physiology in 1991.

Political career
Her political career began while she was attending university. In 1986, she joined the People's Students Federation, a student wing of the Pakistan People's Party, when political activities were banned. Her activism began during this period of military rule. Three years later, Raza was elected as the Joint Secretary of the People's Student Federation.

In 1990, after the right-wing conservative alliance, the Islamic Democratic Alliance (IDA), formed a government, she was arrested and incarcerated for almost a month for her political activities, based upon allegations of a double murder and possession of illegal arms. The charges were later dropped.

Politically she was a protege of Benazir Bhutto, who picked her for the party's "reserved women's seat" in the Sindh Assembly for the 2009 elections.

Personal life
In 1991, she married Ghulam Qadir, a former politician and then a general manager for Shahzeb Pharmaceutical Company. Her first child, a daughter, was born in 1992; in 1994 she had a son. Both of them were killed in a traffic accident in 2005.

References 

1964 births
Living people
Peoples Students Federation
Pakistani Shia Muslims
Pakistan People's Party MPAs (Sindh)
Politicians from Karachi
Sindh MPAs 2008–2013
Sindh MPAs 2013–2018
Women members of the Provincial Assembly of Sindh
Pakistani prisoners and detainees
Women legislative deputy speakers
University of Karachi alumni
Deputy Speakers of the Provincial Assembly of Sindh
Sindh MPAs 2018–2023
21st-century Pakistani women politicians